Loch'd & Loaded is the third album by the band The Real McKenzies, released in 2001 (see 2001 in music).

Track listing
"Nessie" (Boland, McKenzie, Robertson) – 3:09
"Raise the Banner" (Boland, McKenzie, Robertson) – 2:08
"Lassie / Roamin' in the Gloamin'" (Lauder) – 1:47
"Pickled" (McKenzie, Robertson) - :53
"Memories of Old Pa Fogerty" (Campbell) - :42
"Wild Cattieyote" (McKenzie, Robertson) – 2:07
"Whiskey Scotch Whiskey" (Boland, McKenzie, Robertson) – 1:56
"Scots 'Round the World" (McKenzie, Robertson) – 2:33
"Bitch Off the Money" (Boland, McKenzie) – 2:07
"Gi' Us a Dram" (Boland, McKenzie) – 2:36
"Donald Where's Yer Troosers" (MacFadyen, Stewart) – 1:22
"Flower of Scotland" (Traditional) – 1:23
"Swords of a Thousand Men" (Tudorpole) – 2:23
"Bonnie Mary" (Traditional) – 1:04
"Ballad of John Silver" (Boland, Lambert, Maefield, McKenzie) – 2:22
"Death of a Space Piper" (Coppins) – 1:26

2001 albums
Honest Don's Records albums
The Real McKenzies albums
Loch Ness Monster